Dina Recanati (born Diane Hettena; 1928 – 5 June 2021) was an Israeli artist, sculptor and painter.

Biography
Diane Hettena was born in Cairo, Egypt. In 1946, she married Raphael Recanati in Tel Aviv, Mandatory Palestine.

Recanati created installations, silkscreen prints, reliefs, and tapestries.

Recanati died in Herzliya Pituah at the ate of 93.

See also
 List of public art in Israel
 Women of Israel

References

20th-century Israeli sculptors
Israeli women sculptors
1928 births
2021 deaths
Artists from Cairo
Date of birth missing